Santiago Otheguy (born January 29, 1973 in Buenos Aires) is a film director from Argentina.

Filmography
Drug Scenes (2000)
La León (2007)

References

External links

Argentine film directors
Living people
1973 births
People from Buenos Aires